The canton of Yutz is an administrative division of the Moselle department, northeastern France. Its borders were modified at the French canton reorganisation which came into effect in March 2015. Its seat is in Yutz.

It consists of the following communes:
 
Basse-Rentgen
Berg-sur-Moselle
Beyren-lès-Sierck
Boust
Breistroff-la-Grande
Cattenom
Entrange
Escherange
Évrange
Fixem
Gavisse
Hagen
Hettange-Grande
Illange
Kanfen
Manom
Mondorff
Puttelange-lès-Thionville
Rodemack
Roussy-le-Village
Thionville (partly)
Volmerange-les-Mines
Yutz
Zoufftgen

References

Cantons of Moselle (department)